Stretton  railway station was a railway station at Stretton, Derbyshire, England  built by the North Midland Railway.

History
Stretton station was first opened in 1841 as Smithy Moor, a year after the line opened, but renamed later in 1841. It is also called "Shelton" in the Railway Guide.

It was situated at the Derbyshire summit and the highest point of the line, after the stations at Ambergate and Wingfield, and just before the Clay Cross Tunnel.

The first station buildings were of wooden construction, but these were later replaced by brick built station and station master's house. Shortly after this was completed, the station master's house was incorporated into the station building, and a new station master's house was provided. Although this proved adequate at the time by the 1880s, there were petitions to the Midland Railway for better facilities. In May 1888 the Midland Railway requested tenders for the reconstruction of the station buildings at Stretton. The contract was won by Mr. Slater of Derby and work was approaching completion by early 1889. 

A station on the Ashover Light Railway ( narrow gauge) from Ashover to Clay Cross was built adjoining it, and its passenger services were timed to connect with those on the North Midland.

This was mainly used to carry limestone and fluorspar to the Clay Cross Company works, but also supplied around 400 tons of ballast per week to the railway until the quarry closed in 1950.

The station closed on 11 September 1961. There are no visible remains of the station and platform but the cottage which stands next to the bridge over the railway lines that carries the B6014 was the station master's house and may have contained the ticket and parcel office.

Stationmasters

Charles Broad ca. 1857 - 1858
Henry Simms 1858 - 1862 
Thomas Jackson 1862 - 1864 
J. Taylor from 1864 (formerly station master at Desford)
Joseph Harrison until 1875 (afterwards station master at Mansfield Woodhouse)
Charles Gilman 1875 - 1877 (formerly station master at Grafham)
Edward Bradley 1877 - 1905 (formerly station master at Cheltenham High Street)
V.H. Owen 1905 - 1906 
H.J. Bunker 1906 - 1910
Augustine Angus 1910 - 1924 (afterwards station master at Bentham)
E.B. Bridge 1925 - 1928 (afterwards station master at Horninglow)
Herbert Hardisty from 1928
E.J. Bloor ca. 1948
William P. Barlow until 1953 (afterwards station master at South Wingfield)
P. McAnulty until 1958 (afterwards station master at Perry Barr)

References

History of Derbyshire
Disused railway stations in Derbyshire
Former Midland Railway stations
Railway stations in Great Britain opened in 1841
Railway stations in Great Britain closed in 1961